Fredrik Vangstad Sjølstad (born 29 March 1994) is a Norwegian professional footballer who plays as a midfielder for Eliteserien club HamKam.

Career

HamKam
Sjølstad was brought up from Hamarkameratene's junior team in the start of the 2011 season and played three 1. divisjon games in his first season. His debut came on 28 September 2011 when Sjølstad came in as a 78th minute substitute in a 2–0 home win against Alta.

Hødd
In January 2016, Sjølstad signed a two-year contract with 1. divisjon side Hødd. He played 27 league games for the club who relegated to the 2. divisjon.

Kongsvinger
On 29 March 2017, Fredrik Sjølstad was sold to Kongsvinger. He made his debut for the club on 4 April 2017 in a 3–2 defeat away to Bodø/Glimt.

Molde
On 8 January 2019, Molde FK announced Fredrik Sjølstad as their first signing in 2019. He signed a three-year deal with the Eliteserien club. On 7 April 2019, Sjølstad made his Molde debut as an 80th minute substitute in a 3–0 home win against Stabæk. He made his debut in UEFA competitions when he came in as a 70th minute substitute in Molde's 7–1 win over KR in the UEFA Europa League first qualifying round on 11 July 2019. Sjølstad scored his first goal for the club on 21 July 2019, when he scored the match-winning goal in Molde's 2–1 win over Sarpsborg 08 in Eliteserien.

Return to HamKam
On 18 January 2022, he returned to HamKam on a three-year contract.

Career statistics

Club

Honours
Molde
Eliteserien: 2019

References

1994 births
Living people
Norwegian footballers
Association football midfielders
Eliteserien players
Norwegian First Division players
Hamarkameratene players
IL Hødd players
Kongsvinger IL Toppfotball players
Molde FK players
Footballers from Oslo